Local elections were held in the United Kingdom in 1991. The results were a setback for the governing Conservative Party, who were left with their lowest number of councillors since 1973 - though their popular vote was an improvement from the 1990 local elections (John Major had succeeded Margaret Thatcher as prime minister in November 1990), and the Conservatives would go on to win the general election in 1992.

Labour and the Liberal Democrats both benefited from the Conservative losses.

The main opposition Labour Party gained 584 seats, bringing their number of councillors to 9,504 - their highest since 1975.  Their projected share of the vote was 38%, a decline of 6% from the previous year.  They overtook the Conservatives in number of councillors and would remain in that position until 2003.

The governing Conservative Party lost 1,035 seats, leaving them with 7,985 councillors.  Their share of the vote was projected to be 35%, an increase of 2% from the previous year.

The Liberal Democrats gained 407 seats and had 3,672 councillors after the elections, a record number and a sign of their improving popularity after a series of disastrous performances in local and European elections after their formation in March 1988. Their projected share of the vote was 22%, up from 17% in 1990.

Summary of results

England

Metropolitan boroughs
All 36 metropolitan borough councils had one third of their seats up for election.

District councils

Whole council
In 185 districts the whole council was up for election.

Three of those districts - Oadby and Wigston, Tonbridge and Malling and Torbay - returned to whole councils elections having previously been elected by thirds.

In 9 districts there were new ward boundaries, following further electoral boundary reviews by the Local Government Boundary Commission for England.

These were the last elections to the district councils of Langbaurgh-on-Tees, Middlesbrough, Stockton-on-Tees and Woodspring before they were made unitary authorities by the Local Government Commission for England (1992).

These were also the last elections to the district councils of Beverley, Boothferry, Cleethorpes, East Yorkshire, Glanford, Holderness, Kingswood, Medina, Northavon, South Wight and Wansdyke before they were abolished and replaced by unitary authorities by the Local Government Commission for England (1992).

‡ New ward boundaries

Third of council
In 111 districts one third of the council was up for election.

Wales

District councils

These were the last elections to the district councils before they were abolished by the Local Government (Wales) Act 1994.

References

Local elections 2006. House of Commons Library Research Paper 06/26.
Vote 1999 BBC News
Vote 2000 BBC News